Jonay Miguel Hernández Santos (born 15 February 1979) is a Venezuelan former footballer who played as a left-back.

He held a Spanish passport due to having spent almost his entire professional career in that nation, mainly in Segunda División B where he appeared in 212 matches over one full decade.

Hernández represented Venezuela at the 2004 Copa América.

Club career
Born in Maracay, Hernández begun his football career in Spain with Universidad de Las Palmas CF. In the following seasons, also in the country, he played mainly in the Segunda División B, successively representing Real Madrid Castilla, CD Tenerife B (Tercera División) and CD Ourense.

In the summer of 2002, Hernández had his first – and only – taste of top-flight football, signing with Scottish Premier League side Dundee FC. On 28 August 2004 he closed the scoring in a 4–4 draw at Hibernian, as the campaign eventually ended in relegation.

In February 2005, after 89 competitive matches, Hernández returned to Spain and joined Córdoba CF. With this club and Ciudad de Murcia he would make a total of 15 appearances in Segunda División in two season halves, after which he returned to the lower leagues.

International career
Hernández made 29 appearances for the Venezuela national team. He made his debut on 26 July 2003 in a friendly against Nigeria, a 1–0 loss at Watford's Vicarage Road, and was selected for the following year's Copa América held in Peru.

Personal life
Hernández's younger brother, Daniel, is a footballer. A goalkeeper, he too has spent most of his professional career in Spain, also being a Venezuelan international.

References

External links

1979 births
Living people
Venezuelan people of Spanish descent
Sportspeople from Maracay
Venezuelan footballers
Association football defenders
Segunda División players
Segunda División B players
Tercera División players
CD Tenerife B players
Universidad de Las Palmas CF footballers
Real Madrid Castilla footballers
CD Ourense footballers
Córdoba CF players
Ciudad de Murcia footballers
Zamora CF footballers
Racing de Ferrol footballers
Pontevedra CF footballers
UD Melilla footballers
CD Leganés players
CD Tenerife players
Scottish Premier League players
Dundee F.C. players
Venezuela international footballers
2004 Copa América players
Venezuelan expatriate footballers
Expatriate footballers in Spain
Expatriate footballers in Scotland
Venezuelan expatriate sportspeople in Spain
Venezuelan expatriate sportspeople in Scotland